The New Zealand Athletics Championships is an annual outdoor track and field competition organised by Athletics New Zealand, which serves as the national championship for the sport in New Zealand. It usually takes place over a three-day period from Friday to Sunday. Typically organised in the Southern Hemisphere summer months of February or March, the competition was inaugurated in 1887 as a men-only event, with women's events being added to the programme from 1926 onwards. National championship events were held twice in 1973 and 1989, with the 1974 and 1990 championships brought forward and not being held that year.

The early years of the meet served as a colonial competition for the British dominion. New Zealand also sent teams for the Australasian Athletics Championships during its lifetime from 1890 to 1927.

Separate annual championship events are held for the 10,000 metres, 3000 metres, combined track and field events, cross country running, mountain running, road running and racewalking events.

Events
The competition programme features a total of 36 individual New Zealand Championship athletics events, 18 for men and 18 for women. There are six track running events, three obstacle events, four jumps, and four throws. Track races were contested over imperial distances until metric standardisation in 1970.

Track running
100 metres, 200 metres, 400 metres, 800 metres, 1500 metres, 5000 metres
Obstacle events
100 metres hurdles (women only), 110 metres hurdles (men only), 400 metres hurdles, 3000 metres steeplechase
Jumping events
Pole vault, high jump, long jump, triple jump
Throwing events
Shot put, discus throw, javelin throw, hammer throw
Walking events
3000 metres walk

The 3000 metres distance was incorporated into the main track and field championships from 1989 up to 2005 for men and from 1976 to 2005 for women. Men contested a 220-yard hurdles until 1970 (with the final event being in the 200 metres hurdles format). A men's 5000 m track walk was introduced in 1975 and was amended to the 3000 m distance in 2000.

Women had an additional short sprint event over 75 yards, which was last held in 1960. The women's programme gradually expanded to match the men's. A women's mile run was first added in 1968 and changed to 1500 m two years later. The 10,000 m was added in 1985 and the 5000 m was included the following year. (Road running also expanded in this time with the first women's marathon national championship occurring in 1980 and a half marathon national title being awarded from 1991 onwards.) The women's 80 metres hurdles was converted to the international standard of 100 m in 1969 and the first women's 400 m hurdles happened six years later in 1975. The women's pentathlon was expanded to the heptathlon at the combined events championship in 1982. The inclusion of triple jump in 1988 boosted the women's jumps programme and the addition of both hammer throw and pole vault in 1992 brought the women's field events to parity with the men. A women's walk was added in 1985. Women achieved parity of events across the programme with the introduction of a women's 2000 metres steeplechase in 1997. This was lengthened to 3000 m to match the men's version in 2001.

Editions

Championships records

Men

Women

References

Championships data
National Outdoor 5000m Championships for New Zealand. Association of Road Racing Statisticians. Retrieved 2018-04-22.

Athletics competitions in New Zealand
National athletics competitions
Recurring sporting events established in 1887
Athletics
New Zealand Athletics Championships